The following outline is provided as an overview of and topical guide to anarchism, generally defined as the political philosophy which holds the state to be undesirable, unnecessary and harmful, or alternatively as opposing authority and hierarchical organization in the conduct of human relations. Proponents of anarchism, known as anarchists, advocate stateless societies or non-hierarchical voluntary associations.

Nature of anarchism

Manifestos and expositions 

Anarchism is a living project which has continued to evolve as social conditions have changed. The following are examples of anarchist manifestos and essays produced during various time periods, each expressing different interpretations and proposals for anarchist philosophy.
 (1840–1914)
 Anarchist Manifesto (1850) by Anselme Bellegarrigue
 State Socialism and Anarchism (1886) by Benjamin Tucker
 The Principles of Anarchism by Lucy Parsons
 Anarchy (1891) by Errico Malatesta
 The Soul of Man under Socialism (1891) by Oscar Wilde
 Anarchy Defended by Anarchists (1896) by Emma Goldman and Johann Most
 (1914–1984)
 Anarchism and Our Times (1925) by Nestor Makhno
 Organizational Platform of the General Union of Anarchists (Draft) (1926) by Dielo Truda
 What's Anarchism? (1932) by Hippolyte Havel
 The Philosophy of Anarchism (1940) by Herbert Read
 Anarchism: Past and Present (1980) by Murray Bookchin
 (1985–present)
 Anarchism and Other Impediments to Anarchy (1985) by Bob Black
 Listen, Anarchist! (1987) by Chaz Bufe
 Social Anarchism or Lifestyle Anarchism: An Unbridgeable Chasm (1994) by Murray Bookchin
 The Anarchist Tension (1996) by Alfredo M. Bonanno
 An Anarchist FAQ (2008)

Anarchist schools of thought 

Anarchism has many heterogeneous and diverse schools of thought, united by a common opposition to compulsory rule. Anarchist schools are characterized by "the belief that government is both harmful and unnecessary", but may differ fundamentally, supporting anything from extreme individualism to complete collectivism. Regardless, some are viewed as being compatible, and it is not uncommon for individuals to subscribe to more than one. Some of the following terms do not refer to specific branches of anarchist thought, but rather are generic labels applied to various branches, they are marked as umbrella terms.

Classical 
 Individualist anarchism (umbrella term) – several traditions of thought that emphasize the individual and their will over any kinds of external determinants such as groups, society, traditions and ideological systems.
 Philosophical anarchism – according to The Blackwell Dictionary of Modern Social Thought, philosophical anarchism "is a component especially of individualist anarchism". This tendency contends that the state lacks moral legitimacy and there is no individual obligation or duty to obey the state, which conversely, has no right to command individuals, but does not advocates revolution to eliminate the state.
 Egoist anarchism – a tendency originated in the philosophy of Max Stirner which is usually called "egoism". It rejects devotion to "a great idea, a  cause, a doctrine, a system, a lofty calling", saying that the egoist has no political calling but rather "lives themselves out" without regard to "how well or ill humanity may fare thereby".
 Illegalism – a tendency that developed primarily in France, Italy, Belgium and Switzerland during the early 1900s. It embraces either openly or secretly criminality as a lifestyle, using Max Stirner's Egoism as a justification. Illegalism does not specify the type of crime, though it is associated with theft and shoplifting.
 Existentialist anarchism – some observers believe existentialism forms a philosophical ground for anarchism. Anarchist historian Peter Marshall claims, "there is a close link between the existentialists' stress on the individual, free choice, and moral responsibility and the main tenets of anarchism".
 Mutualism – some see mutualism as between individualist and social forms of anarchism. This tendency concerns with reciprocity, free association, voluntary contract, federation and credit and currency reform. It states that a market without government intervention drives prices down to labor-costs, eliminating profit, rent and interest according to the labor theory of value forcing firms to compete over workers by raising the wages (instead of workers competing over firms).
 Social anarchism (umbrella term) – several traditions of thought that emphasize the social life and relations. While individualists focus on personal autonomy and the rational nature of human beings, social anarchism sees "individual freedom as conceptually connected with social equality and emphasize community and mutual aid", aggregating tendencies that advocates the communitarian and cooperative aspects of anarchist theory and practice.
 Collectivist anarchism – a revolutionary tendency most commonly associated with Mikhail Bakunin, Johann Most and the anti-authoritarian section of the First International. It opposes all private ownership of the means of production, instead advocating that ownership be collectivized. Some collectivists do not oppose the use of currency, supporting workers being paid based on the amount of time they contributed to production and purchasing commodities in a communal market. This contrasts with anarcho-communism where wages and currency would be abolished and where individuals would take freely from a storehouse of goods.
 Anarcho-communism – tendency that advocates the abolition of the state, capitalism, currency, wages and private property (while retaining respect for personal property), in favor of common ownership of the means of production, direct democracy, and a horizontal network of voluntary associations and workers' councils with production and consumption based on the guiding principle "from each according to his ability, to each according to his need".
 Magonism – magonistas were how Mexican government and the press of the early 20th century called people and groups who shared the ideas of Ricardo Flores Magón, an anarcho-communist who inspired the overthrow of the dictatorship of Porfirio Díaz and performed an economic and political revolution.

Post-classical 
 Anarcha-feminism – a tendency that combines anarchism with feminism. It views patriarchy as a manifestation of involuntary coercive hierarchy that should be replaced by decentralized free association. It states that the struggle against patriarchy is an essential part of class struggle, and the anarchist struggle against the state.
 Green anarchism – a tendency that puts a particular emphasis on environmental issues. It extends anarchist ideology beyond a critique of human interactions, including a critique of the interactions between humans and non-humans, which culminates in a revolutionary praxis that is not merely dedicated to human liberation, but also to interspecies liberation, aiming to bring about an environmentally sustainable anarchist society.
 Anarcho-naturism – a tendency that unites anarchist and naturist philosophies, that advocates vegetarianism, free love, hiking and an ecological world view within anarchist groups and outside them, also promoting small ecovillages, and most prominently nudism as a way to avoid the artificiality of the industrial mass society of modernity.
 Anarcho-primitivism – tendency that critiques the origins and progress of civilization, which states that the shift from hunter-gatherer to agricultural subsistence gave rise to social stratification, coercion, alienation, and population growth.
 Social ecology – a theory associated with Murray Bookchin through his work. It is a utopian philosophy of human evolution that combines the nature of biology and society into a third "thinking nature" beyond biochemistry and physiology, which is argued as a more complete, conscious, ethical, and rational nature, that view humanity as the latest development from the long history of organic development on Earth. It proposes ethical principles for replacing a society's propensity for hierarchy and domination with that of democracy and freedom.
 Anarcho-pacifism – tendency within the anarchist movement that rejects the use of violence in the struggle for social change and the abolition of the state.
 Insurrectionary anarchism – revolutionary tendency and practice that emphasizes insurrection within anarchist practice and criticize formal organizations such as labor unions and federations that are based on a political programme and periodic congresses, advocating informal organization and small affinity group based organization. Insurrectionary anarchists put value in attack, permanent class conflict and a refusal to negotiate or with class enemies.
 Religious anarchism (umbrella term) – religious anarchists view organised religion mostly as authoritarian and hierarchical that has strayed from its humble origins.
 Buddhist anarchism – tendency that notes Buddhist scriptures such as the Kalama Sutta to have an inherently libertarian emphasis, placing a priority on the questioning of all authority and dogma, with properly informed personal choice as final arbiter. The Indian revolutionary atheist Har Dayal, influenced by Karl Marx and Mikhail Bakunin,  moved to Oakland and established the Bakunin Institute of California, described as "the first monastery of anarchism".
 Christian anarchism – tendency that avocates that there is only one source of authority to which Christians are ultimately answerable, the authority of God as embodied in the teachings of Jesus. It states that freedom from government or Church is justified spiritually and will only be guided by the grace of God if Man shows compassion to others and turns the other cheek when confronted with violence.
 Jewish anarchism – tendency that combines contemporary radical ideas with traditional Judaism. Some Jewish mystical groups were based on anti-authoritarian principles, somewhat similar to the Christian Quakers and Dukhobors. Martin Buber, a deeply religious philosopher, had frequently referred to the Hasidic tradition. The Orthodox Kabbalist rabbi Yehuda Ashlag believed in a religious version of libertarian communism, based on principles of Kabbalah, which he called altruist communism.
 Anarchism without adjectives – in the words of historian George Esenwein, "referred to an unhyphenated form of anarchism, that is, a doctrine without any qualifying labels such as communist, collectivist, mutualist, or individualist. For others, ... [it] was simply understood as an attitude that tolerated the coexistence of different anarchist schools." It served as basis for the synthesis anarchism federation.

Contemporary 
 Black anarchism – a loose term sometimes applied to group together a number of people of African descent who identify with anarchism opposing the existence of the state, the subjugation and domination of black people, and other groups, and favor a non-hierarchical organization of society. It argues for class struggle while stressing the importance of ending racial and national oppression, opposing white supremacy, patriarchy and capitalism, rejecting narrow or vulgar forms of "anarchism" that ignore issues of race and national oppression.
 Crypto-anarchism – a tendency of anarchy accomplished through computer technology, employing cryptographic software to evade persecution and harassment while sending and receiving information over computer networks, in an effort to protect their privacy, their political freedom, and their economic freedom.
 Free-market anarchism (umbrella term) – a tendency that advocate an economic system based on voluntary market interactions without the involvement of the state. There is a branch of market anarchism which is left-wing market anarchism (such as mutualists) that is anti-capitalist and self-identify as part of the socialist movement and there is another branch who identify as anarcho-capitalists stress the legitimacy and priority of private property, describing it as an integral component of individual rights and a free market economy (though it is disputed if anarcho-capitalism is a form of anarchism, due to anarchists's anti-capitalism). Thus, the term may refer either to libertarian socialists (like Pierre-Joseph Proudhon and Benjamin Tucker) or to anarcho-capitalists (like Murray Rothbard and David D. Friedman). 
Agorism – a tendency that advocates the creation of a society in which all relations between people are voluntary exchanges by means of counter-economics, thus engaging with aspects of peaceful revolution, proposed by the libertarian philosopher Samuel Edward Konkin III.
 Anarcho-capitalism – political philosophy which advocates the elimination of the state in favor of individual sovereignty, private property, and open markets. Anarcho-capitalists believe that in the absence of statute (law by decree or legislation), society would improve itself through the discipline of the free market (or what its proponents describe as a "voluntary society"). See anarchism and capitalism. A strong current within anarchism does not consider anarcho-capitalism to be part of the anarchist movement because anarchism has historically been an anti-capitalist movement and for definitional reasons which see anarchism as incompatible with capitalist forms.
 Left-wing market anarchism – a tendency of individualist anarchism which stress the value of radically free markets, termed "freed markets" to distinguish them from the common conception which libertarians believe to be riddled with statist and capitalist privileges. also referred to as market-oriented left-libertarians, proponents of this approach strongly affirm the classical liberal ideas of self-ownership and free markets while maintaining that taken to their logical conclusions these ideas support anti-capitalist, anti-corporatist, anti-hierarchical and pro-labor positions in economics; anti-imperialism in foreign policy; and radical views regarding such cultural issues as gender, sexuality and race. Left-libertarians who support private property do so under the condition that recompense is offered to the local community.
 Postcolonial anarchism – a tendency strongly influenced by indigenism, anti-state forms of nationalism and Anarchist People of Color, that aims to bring together disparate aspects and tendencies within the anarchist movement and re-envision them in an explicitly anti-imperialist framework. Since traditional anarchism is a movement arising from the struggles of proletarians in industrialized western European nations – and thus sees history from their perspective – post-colonial anarchism approaches the same principles (mutual aid, class struggle, opposition to social hierarchy, community-level self-management, libertarian municipalism, and self-determination but from the perspective of colonized peoples throughout the world and seeking to add what it sees as a unique and important perspective.
 Post-anarchism – political philosophy that employs post-structuralist and postmodernist approaches (the term post-structuralist anarchism is used as well, so as not to suggest having moved beyond anarchism). Post-anarchism is not a single coherent theory, but rather refers to the combined works of any number of post-modernists and post-structuralists such as Michel Foucault, Gilles Deleuze, Jacques Lacan, Jacques Derrida, Jean Baudrillard; postmodern feminists such as Judith Butler; and alongside those of classical anarchist and libertarian philosophers such as Zhuang Zhou, Emma Goldman, Max Stirner, and Friedrich Nietzsche. Thus, the terminology can vary widely in both approach and outcome.
 Post-left anarchy – a recent current in anarchist thought that promotes a critique of anarchism's relationship to traditional leftism. Influenced by the work of Max Stirner and by the Situationist International, post-left anarchy is marked by a focus on social insurrection and a diminution of leftist social organisation.
 Queer anarchism – a tendency that advocates anarchism and social revolution as a means of queer liberation and abolition of homophobia, lesbophobia, transmisogyny, biphobia, transphobia, heteronormativity, heterosexism, patriarchy and the gender binary. LGBT and anarchism who campaigned for LGBT rights both outside and inside the anarchist and LGBT movements include John Henry Mackay, Daniel Guérin and the individualist Adolf Brand who published Der Eigene, the first publication dedicated to gay issues in the world.
 Anarcho-transhumanism – the philosophy that social liberty is inherently bound up with material liberty, and that freedom is ultimately a matter of expanding people's capacity and opportunities to engage with the world around them through technology. It is the realization that one's resistance against those social forces that would subjugate and limit us is but part of a spectrum of efforts to expand human agency, to facilitate our inquiry and creativity.

Affinity groups 

Anarchists creates different forms of organizations, structured around the principles of anarchism, to meet each other, share information, organize struggles and trace ways to spread the anarchist ideas through the world, since they understand that the only way to achieve a free and egalitarian society in the end is through equally free and egalitarian means.
 Platformist federation – a form of anarchist organization that seeks unity upon its participants, having as a defining characteristic the idea that each platformist organization should include only members that are which are fully aligned with the group ideas, rejecting people with any level of conflicting ideas, or different tendencies or schools of anarchist thought.
 Synthesis federation – a form of anarchist organization that seeks diversity upon its participants,  which tries to join anarchists of different tendencies under the principles of anarchism without adjectives. In the 1920s it brought together anarchists of three main tendencies, individualist anarchism, anarcho-communism and anarcho-syndicalism and it is the main principle behind the anarchist federations grouped around the contemporary global International of Anarchist Federations.
 Anarcho-syndicalist union – a form of anarchist organization focused on the labour movement that views revolutionary industrial unionism or syndicalism as a method for workers in capitalist society to gain control of an economy and with that control influence in broader society, with the basic principles being: solidarity, direct action and direct democracy, or workers' self-management. The end goal of syndicalism is to abolish the wage system, regarding it as wage slavery.

History of anarchism 

Although social movements and philosophies with anarchic qualities predate anarchism, anarchism as a specific political philosophy began in 1840 with the publication of What Is Property? by Pierre-Joseph Proudhon. In the following decades it spread from Western Europe to various regions, countries, and continents, impacting local social movements. The success of the 1917 October Revolution in Russia initiated a decline in prominence for anarchism in the mid-20th century, roughly coinciding with the time period referred to by historians as The short twentieth century. Since the late 1980s, anarchism has begun a gradual return to the world stage.

Global events 
 Historic precedents and background events (pre-1840)
 1793William Godwin publishes Enquiry Concerning Political Justice, implicitly establishing the philosophical foundations of anarchism.
 1827Josiah Warren opens the Cincinnati Time Store, an early experiment in mutualist economics.
 Classical development and global expansion (1840–1917)
 1840Pierre-Joseph Proudhon publishes What Is Property? and becomes history's first self-proclaimed anarchist.
 1864the International Workingmen's Association (IWA) is founded. Early seeds of split between anarchists and Marxists begin.
 1871the Paris Commune takes place. Early anarchists (mutualists) participate.
 1872the IWA meets at the Hague Congress. Anarchists expelled by Marxist branch, beginning the anarchist/Marxist conflict.
 1878Max Hödel fails in assassination attempt against Kaiser Wilhelm I. Ushers in era of propaganda of the deed.
 1882 God and the State by Mikhail Bakunin is published.
 1886 the Haymarket affair takes place, origin of May Day as a worker's holiday and inspires a new generation of anarchists.
 1892 The Conquest of Bread by Peter Kropotkin published and establishes anarcho-communism.
 1911 the High Treason Incident leads to the execution of twelve Japanese anarchists, the first major blow against the Japanese anarchist movement.
 Post-World War I decline (1918 – )
 1917 – the Russian Revolution creates first "socialist state". The combination of a Soviet dictatorship in the east, the Red Scare in the west, and the global Cold War, discourage anarchist revolution throughout the following decades.
 1919–21the Makhnovshchina, the first major anarchist revolution, is established in the Ukraine.
 1919–21the Palmer Raids effectively cripple the anarchist movement in the United States.
 1921the Communist Party of China is founded. The anarchist movement in China begins slow decline due to communist repression.
 1929–31the autonomous Shinmin region, the second major anarchist revolution, is established in Manchuria.
 1936–39the Spanish Revolution, the third and last major anarchist revolution, is established in Catalonia and surrounding areas.
 1959the Cuban Revolution establishes a communist dictatorship. The Cuban anarchist movement is immediately repressed.
 1974 – the Dallas Accord, anarcho-capitalism is tolerated inside Libertarian Party.
 Post-Cold War resurgence ( – present)
 1999anarchists take part in riots which interrupt the WTO conference in Seattle. It is viewed as part of an anarchist resurgence in the United States.

History of anarchism by region

Historians 

 Paul Avrich
 David Goodway
 Daniel Guérin
 Peter Marshall
 Max Nettlau
 George Woodcock
 Historical societies
 Anarchy Archives
 Centre International de Recherches sur l'Anarchisme
 Kate Sharpley Library
 Labadie Collection

General anarchism concepts 

These are concepts which, although not exclusive to anarchism, are significant in historical and/or modern anarchist circles. As the anarchist milieu is philosophically heterogeneous, there is disagreement over which of these concepts should play a role in anarchism.

Organizations

Notable organizations 

Formal anarchist organizational initiatives date back to the mid-19th century. The oldest surviving anarchist organizations include Freedom Press (est. 1886) of England, the Industrial Workers of the World (est. 1905), Anarchist Black Cross (est. 1906), Central Organisation of the Workers of Sweden (est. 1910) and the Confederación Nacional del Trabajo (est. 1910) of Spain.

Structures 
Anarchist organizations come in a variety of forms, largely based upon common anarchist principles of voluntary cooperation, mutual aid, and direct action. They are also largely informed by anarchist social theory and philosophy, tending towards participation and decentralization.
 Affinity group (e.g. Black bloc)
 Adhocracy
 Collective
 Federation
 Participatory organization
 Popular assembly
 Security culture
 Spokescouncil

Anarchist literature 
 List of anarchist books
 List of anarchist periodicals



Influential non-anarchists

Related philosophies 
 Absurdism 
 Communalism 
 Democratic confederalism
 Existentialism 
 Inclusive Democracy  
 Libertarian Marxism 
 Libertarian socialism 
 Neozapatismo 
 Nihilism 
 Panarchism 
 Voluntaryism

See also 

 Anti-globalization/Globalization
 Anti-fascism
 Anti-war
 Civil rights
 Labour movement
 Tax resistance

Footnotes

Further reading

External links 
 "Anarchism", entry from the Encyclopædia Britannica Eleventh Edition, (1910) by Peter Kropotkin.

Outlines of philosophy topics
Wikipedia outlines